Brain trust was a term that originally described a group of close advisers to a political candidate or incumbent; these were often academics who were prized for their expertise in particular fields. The term is most associated with the group of advisers of Franklin D. Roosevelt during his presidential administration. More recently, however, the use of the term has expanded beyond politics to encompass any specialized group of advisers aligned to a decision maker.

Etymology
Early use of the term "brain trust" was patterned on the use of the term "trust" to depict economic consolidation within an industry. This was a subject of much interest at the time and led to the Sherman Antitrust Act in 1890. In 1888 the Springfield [Missouri] Leader used the term in connection with the consolidation of newspapers in the state: "[Too many newspapers in Columbia, Mo.] overstocked the brain market of that town, and the Columbian and Statesman formed a "trust." ... While sugar, coffee, lumber, whiskey, iron, coal and other trusts are forming we can see no reason why a 'brain trust' can't be organized." Around the same time the Philadelphia Press penned a witticism concerning free traders that made the rounds of U.S. papers. The joke implies the lack of thought output, just as "trusts (consolidation of productive units) reduced industrial output: "Some of the free trade shouters display enough ignorance to excite a suspicion that they have been made the victims of a brain 'trust.'" Using the term as an analogy to industrial trusts seems to have spread widely in 1888. For example, lawyers who signed a fee-fixing agreement were called a "brain trust." In a long lament of the independence of small editors, the Marion [Ohio] Star says that a "Brains Trust" is evidenced by the "machine made" opinions of gullible editors.

Around the same time the term "brain trust" was employed in a slightly different sense by journalists covering Henry Cabot Lodge. During the Spanish–American War in 1898, a group of journalists would gather in Senator Lodge's committee room and discuss with him the progress of the war. Lodge called this group his "board of strategy," but the Senate press corp called it "the brain trust."

The sense of the term as depicting a collection of well informed experts was this sense that seemed to catch hold. For example, in 1901 a group of journalists in a state press association was called a "brain trust" by the Deseret Evening News. It was not long before the term described a group that was so expert that their advice would be almost inevitably agreed to and acted upon. Such was the reference to the eight senators who made up the "Brain Trust of the Senate" as described by William Allen White in the Saturday Evening Post. That use became regular for the next two decades, as can be seen from the use by Time magazine in 1928, which ran a headline on a meeting of the American Council on Learned Societies titled "Brain Trust".

Roosevelt's "Brain Trust"
Franklin D. Roosevelt's speechwriter and legal counsel Samuel Rosenman suggested having an academic team to advise Roosevelt in March 1932. In 1932, The New York Times writer James Kieran first used the term Brains Trust (shortened to Brain Trust later) when he applied it to the close group of experts that surrounded United States presidential candidate Franklin Roosevelt. According to Roosevelt Brain Trust member Raymond Moley, Kieran coined the term, however Rosenman contended that Louis Howe, a close advisor to the President, first used the term but used it derisively in a conversation with Roosevelt.

The core of the Roosevelt brain trust initially consisted of a group of Columbia Law School professors (Moley, Tugwell, and Berle). These men played a key role in shaping the policies of the First New Deal (1933). Although they never met together as a group, they each had Roosevelt's ear. Many newspaper editorials and editorial cartoons ridiculed them as impractical idealists.

The core of the Roosevelt brain trust later consisted of men associated with the Harvard law school (Cohen, Corcoran, and Frankfurter). These men played a key role in shaping the policies of the Second New Deal (1935–1936).

Members

First New Deal
 Adolf Berle – original Brain Trust
 Samuel Rosenman
 Basil O'Connor
 Hugh S. Johnson
 Raymond Moley – original Brain Trust (Moley broke with Roosevelt and became a sharp critic of the New Deal from the right)
 Rexford Tugwell – original Brain Trust
 Frances Perkins
 Harry Hopkins – original Brain Trust
 Harold L. Ickes
 George F. Warren
 Charles William Taussig
 Louis Brandeis
 James Warburg

Second New Deal
 Benjamin V. Cohen
 Thomas Gardiner Corcoran
 Felix Frankfurter

Other advisers 
 Louis Howe
 James A. Farley
 Paul M. O'Leary 
 George Peek
 Charles William Taussig
 Robert F. Wagner
 F. Palmer Weber

In popular culture

The movie His Girl Friday (1940) contains the following exchange:

See also

Black Cabinet, a group of African Americans who served as public policy advisors to President Franklin D. Roosevelt and his wife Eleanor Roosevelt
The Brains Trust, an informational BBC radio and later television programme popular in the United Kingdom during the 1940s and 1950s
Kitchen Cabinet, a term used by political opponents of President of the United States Andrew Jackson to describe a collection of unofficial advisors he consulted
Think tank, a research institute/center and organization that performs research and advocacy concerning topics such as social policy, political strategy, economics, military, technology, and culture.

References and sources
References

Sources
Moley, Raymond. (1939). After seven years
Tugwell, Rexford. (1968). The Brains Trust
Editorial cartoons
Rosen, Elliot. (1977). Hoover, Roosevelt, and the Brains Trust.
McElvaine, Robert. (1984). The Great Depression: America 1929–1941

United States presidential advisors
United States presidential history
Presidency of Franklin D. Roosevelt